Empty Box EP was Blindside's second release as a follow-up to the Swedish version of the self-titled debut. When the self-titled debut was released in the US it also featured songs from the "Empty Box EP".

Track listing
 "Empty Box" – 4:04
 "Born" – 3:27
 "Replay" – 2:46
 "Teddybear" – 4:28
 "Daughter (Demo)" – 2:35

1996 EPs
Blindside (band) albums